Khabab (Syriac: ܟܚܐܒܐܒ) is a town located in southern Syria in the Hauran plain, part of the Daraa Governorate, 57 km (~36 miles) south of Damascus and about the same distance from the city of Daraa.

The old name of the town is Abiba, which in Aramaic and Syriac means a plain green grass.

History
In 1596 Khabab appeared in the Ottoman tax registers as Habab and was part of the nahiya (subdistrict) of Bani Kilab in the Hauran Sanjak. It had a Muslim population consisting of 45 households and 30 bachelors, and a Christian population consisting of 3 households and 2 bachelors. The villagers paid a fixed tax-rate of 40% on   wheat, barley, summer crops, goats and beehives; a total of 12,800 akçe.

Demographics
Khabab had a population of 3,379 in 2004, according to the Syria Central Bureau of Statistics (CBS). The population inside the town is 8,000-10,000 (According to the seasons in summer most people return summer vacations) and around 40,000 who are living outside Syria, most of them are scattered between, France, United States, Canada, Brazil and Australia and a number of Arab countries.

- Population Growth: 1.01%
- The proportion: Females 51%, Males 49%.

Religion
The population of Khabab is mostly made up of Christians, in particular members of the Melkite Greek Catholic Church. The latter’s Archeparchy of Bosra–Hauran has its see in the city's cathedral of the Dormition. Other churches include of Saint Rita and Saint Michael, plus a nunnery of the Besançon Charity Sisters.

Climate
Weather in Khabab follows the southern region of Syria, a moderate with a few waves of a cold winter and relatively hot in the summer.

The climate in Khabab clearly shows the seasons sequence, summer the air tends to be heat during the day with a beautiful night with a dry breeze, and autumn begins with yellow leaves and cooler weather followed by cold winters, especially in the months of December and January and February, where spring begins with March.

Rainfall average ~250 mm (till year 2000), temperature Min, Max (-4 Winter)-(38 Summer) C temperature average (4.4 Winter)-(30 Summer) C

Economy
The people in Khabab are farmers basically (as the most of southern Syria) reliance on agriculture was the only source of livelihood.
In recent years, people's dependence on agriculture has remarkably dropped down for several reasons, including:
 Dependency on rainfall and this affects the amount of the crop by the amount of rainfall and the most important rainfed crops are wheat, barley and lentils. irrigation agriculture become commonly used for vegetables as: tomatoes, watermelon, carrots, etc., and common fruit trees as: grapes, olives, almonds became an important crop.
 Most of the residents are employees in the public sector or the private sector, therefore, now monthly salary is the basic income source.
 Youth migration to the main cities, especially the capital, Damascus, and out-migration to the Persian Gulf region or Europe or America or Australia, and the youth generation in the town are no longer interested in following in the life pattern of their parents and grandparents, concerning agriculture.
 The dispute over large areas of the town between the residents and the Bedouin who used to work for the residents of Khabab, and  moved to the area between 1910 and 1918, this issues affected the agricultural activity, but the problem of the land has not been solved yet, and this is what makes many residents do not trust the future of agriculture in the town of Khabab anymore
 That a number of people head to work in the areas of commercial and industrial.

Education and culture
The school was that follow the Archdiocese and the monastery the most important reasons to encourage the education and science in khabab as well as the surrounding villages.

There are seven schools in the town, distributed as follows: kindergarten, two schools of basic education (primary) and four of middle and high stage.

There is a high number of intellectuals and teachers work in the villages and cities of the province Daraa.

Public infrastructure 
Khabab have many public facilities as health clinic and a hospital under construction, a police station, a public consumer shop, and a train station.

Notable people
 

Munir Altheeb (born 1942), scholar, artist and historian critic

References

Bibliography

Sources
 khabab.net

External links
 Map of town, Google Maps
 GCatholic Melkite Catholic Dormition cathedral
  Mesmiye-map; 19M

Populated places in Al-Sanamayn District
Melkite Christian communities in Syria